Rangsarit Sutthisa (born 9 April 1979) is a professional footballer from Thailand.

External links
 Goal.com 
 Players Profile - info.thscore.com
 

1979 births
Living people
Rangsarit Sutthisa
Rangsarit Sutthisa
Association football midfielders
Rangsarit Sutthisa
Rangsarit Sutthisa
Rangsarit Sutthisa
Rangsarit Sutthisa
Rangsarit Sutthisa
Rangsarit Sutthisa